Fofana is a surname. Notable persons with that name include:

 Cédric Fofana (born 2003), Canadian diver
 Datro Fofana (born 2002), Ivorian footballer
 Fodé Fofana (born 2002), Dutch footballer
 Gueïda Fofana (born 1991), French footballer
 Ibrahima Fofana (1952–2010), Guinean trade unionist
 Ibrahima Kassory Fofana (born 1954), Guinean politician
 Mohamed Fofana (footballer, born March 1985), Malian footballer
 Mohamed Fofana (footballer, born May 1985), French footballer
 Mohamed Fofana (footballer, born October 1985), Guinean footballer
 Moinina Fofana (born 1950), Sierra Leonean general
 Moryké Fofana (born 1991), Ivorian footballer
 Seko Fofana (born 1995), French-born Ivorian footballer
 Sékou Fofana (born 1980), Malian footballer
 Wesley Fofana (born 1988), French rugby union player
 Wesley Fofana (born 2000), French footballer
 Yahia Fofana (born 2000), French footballer
 Youssouf Falikou Fofana (born 1966), Ivorian footballer
 Youssouf Fofana (born 1999), French footballer